David H. Brenerman (born March 10, 1951) is an American politician from Maine. Brenerman, a Democrat, served three terms (1978-1984) in the Maine House of Representatives. He also served for three years on Portland's City Council, which included a year as ceremonial mayor. In 2013, he retired after working since 1984 with Unum. He was subsequently hired by Martin's Point Health Care as a consultant.

Brenerman grew up on Munjoy Hill and graduated from Portland High School in 1969 and Clark University in 1973. He also earned a Master's in Public Administration from the University of Maine.

In 2014, Brenerman announced he would seek to replace the retiring John Coyne for District 5 on Portland's City Council.  On November 4, Brenerman won the District 5 seat unopposed. On December 1, he was sworn in as a member of the Portland, Maine City Council.

External links
 Brenerman's Comments before Maine Legislative Committee on Health Care Reform November 1, 2011

References

1951 births
Living people
Democratic Party members of the Maine House of Representatives
Portland, Maine City Council members
Mayors of Portland, Maine
Clark University alumni
University of Maine alumni
Portland High School (Maine) alumni